The Han River is a river in southeast China. The river is combined with two main tributary rivers, Mei River and Ting River, at Sanheba (三河坝), Dabu County. Han River flows south through the Han River Delta entering the South China Sea at Chenghai District and Longhu District of Shantou. The Teochew people refer to the river as "the Mother River".

The river is named after Han Yu, a writer, poet and government official of the Tang dynasty, in honor of his contribution to Chaoshan. It was originally named as E Xi before Han Yu's exile to Chaozhou. The river became pacific under Han's river regulation and named after him after his departure.

Gallery

References

Rivers of Guangdong